John L. Allen Jr. (born January 20, 1965) is an American journalist and author who serves as editor of the Catholic news website Crux, formerly hosted by The Boston Globe and now independently funded. 

Before moving to The Boston Globe when Crux was established in 2014, Allen worked for 16 years in Rome as a Vatican watcher, covering the Holy See and the Pope for the National Catholic Reporter. He also serves as a Senior Vatican Analyst for CNN, and featured in broadcast coverage of the conclaves of 2005 and 2013. Allen is the St. Francis de Sales Fellow of Communication and Media at the Word on Fire Institute founded by Bishop Robert Barron.

Allen is the author of twelve books about the Catholic Church. He has written two biographies of Pope Benedict XVI.

Biography
Born in 1965, Allen grew up in Hays, Kansas. He graduated from Capuchin-founded Thomas More Prep-Marian High School in 1983. He received a bachelor's degree in philosophy from Fort Hays State University and a master's degree in religious studies from the University of Kansas. For several years, Allen taught journalism and oversaw the student-run newspaper, The Knight, at Notre Dame High School in Sherman Oaks, California.

During the coverage of the death of Pope John Paul II, Allen frequently appeared on CNN. He then became the Senior Vatican Analyst for CNN. He also delivers lectures discussing Vatican issues and his latest works. 

On November 5, 2011, St. Michael's College at the University of Toronto awarded him an honorary Doctor of Sacred Letters degree. He has also received honorary doctorates from Lewis University in Romeoville, Illinois; Saint Michael's College in Colchester, Vermont; and the University of Dallas, Irving, Texas."

In 2014, Allen took up a position as associate editor with The Boston Globe and helped to launch its website, Crux. In 2016, the Globe transferred ownership of the Crux website and its intellectual property to Allen. It now operates on the basis of advertising income, syndication and licensing as well as support from benefactors.

Allen and his wife, Elise, who also serves as a Senior Correspondent for Crux, live in Rome.

Publications

In addition to this column and occasional other pieces for NCR, Allen's work as a journalist has appeared in The New York Times, The Washington Post, The Wall Street Journal, CNN, NPR, The Tablet, Jesus, Second Opinion, The Nation, the Miami Herald, Die Furche, and the Irish Examiner.

Allen has written several books. He is the author of two biographies of Pope Benedict XVI. The first was written before then-Cardinal Joseph Ratzinger became pope, the other after his election to the papacy. In 2000, Allen published Cardinal Ratzinger: The Vatican's Enforcer of the Faith, the first biography of Ratzinger in English. Several reviewers criticized it as being biased against Ratzinger. Joseph Komonchak called it "Manichaean journalism." After some examination, Allen concluded that this criticism was valid. In his next biography of Ratzinger, The Rise of Benedict XVI: The Inside Story of How the Pope Was Elected and Where He Will Take the Catholic Church (2005), Allen tried to be fair to all sides and viewpoints. Allen acknowledged that his first book was "unbalanced" because it was his first book and was written, he wrote, "before I arrived in Rome and before I really knew a lot about the universal church." In that acknowledgement he said the first biography "gives prominent voice to criticisms of Ratzinger; it does not give equally prominent voice to how he himself would see some of these issues."

In 2005 he published a book about Opus Dei, Opus Dei: An Objective Look Behind the Myths and Reality of the Most Controversial Force in the Catholic Church. Allen said that one of his reasons for writing his study of Opus Dei was that he felt that liberal and conservative Catholics were too often shouting at each other, and he hoped that a book that tried to be fair to all sides would lead to civilized discussion. According to John Romanowsky of Godspy, Allen's ability to report objectively, without revealing his personal opinion, has been called "maddening".

Kenneth L. Woodward, former religion editor for Newsweek, wrote in 2005: "Outside of the North Korean government in Pyongyang, no bureaucracy is harder for a journalist to crack than the Vatican's. And no one does it better than John L. Allen Jr. ... In just three years, Allen has become the journalist other reporters—and not a few cardinals—look to for the inside story on how all the pope's men direct the world's largest church." 

Allen was critical of how the Vatican communicated the decision to lift the excommunications of the bishops of the Society of Saint Pius X.

Books 
 Cardinal Ratzinger: The Vatican's Enforcer of the Faith. NY: Continuum, 2000. .

 Conclave: The Politics, Personalities, and Process of the Next Papal Election. New York: Doubleday/Image, 2002, revised 2004. .

 All the Pope's Men: The Inside Story of How the Vatican Really Thinks. (Hardcover) New York: Doubleday, 2004. . (Trade Paperback) New York: Doubleday/Image October 2006. .
 Pope Benedict XVI: A Biography of Joseph Ratzinger. NY: Continuum International Publishing Group, 2005. . This is a reprint of Allen's 2000 book Cardinal Ratzinger, reprinted under a new title without Allen's permission.
 The Rise of Benedict XVI: The Inside Story of How the Pope Was Elected and Where He Will Take the Catholic Church. (Hardcover) NY: Doubleday, 2005. . (Trade Paperback) New York: Doubleday/Image October 2006. .
 Allen, John L. Jr. (2005). Opus Dei: An Objective Look Behind the Myths and Reality of the Most Controversial Force in the Catholic Church. New York: Doubleday.
 The Future Church: How Ten Trends are Revolutionizing the Catholic Church. NY: Doubleday, 2009. .
 A People of Hope: Archbishop Timothy Dolan in Conversation with John L. Allen Jr. 2011
 The Catholic Church: What Everyone Needs to Know, 2013
 The Global War on Christians: Dispatches from the Front Lines of Anti-Christian Persecution. Crown Publishing Group, 2013, 
 The Francis miracle; inside the transformation of the Pope and the Church, New York, Time Books, 2015, 276p.

Online articles/columns 
 Crux articles – Archive of John Allen's articles on "Crux: Covering all things Catholic
 Boston Globe articles – Archive of John Allen's column in the Boston Globe
 All Things Catholic – Archive of John Allen's column in the National Catholic Reporter

Critical studies, reviews and biography 
 The Scoop on the Pope – article about Allen by Kenneth Woodward

 Interview with Allen in which he discusses his Opus Dei book and his views on "liberal/conservative" issues

References

External links

 John L. Allen Jr.'s blog
 
 

1965 births
The New York Times columnists
The Boston Globe people
American Roman Catholic religious writers
American television reporters and correspondents
CNN people
Living people
University of Kansas alumni
Fort Hays State University alumni
People from Hays, Kansas